The 2002 Winter Paralympics, the eighth Paralympic Winter Games, were held in Salt Lake City, Utah, United States, from March 7 to 16, 2002. A total of 416 athletes from 36 nations participated. They were the first Winter Paralympics in the American continent.
These were the first Paralympic Winter Games for Andorra, Chile, China, Croatia, Greece, and Hungary. Ragnhild Myklebust of Norway won five gold medals in skiing and biathlon, becoming the most successful Winter Paralympic athlete of all time with 22 medals, 17 of them gold.

Opening ceremony
The opening ceremony was held on 7 March 2002 at Rice-Eccles Stadium, with more than 40,000 spectators. Muffy Davis and Chris Waddell jointly lit the Paralympic cauldron.

Closing ceremony
The closing ceremony with a more than 25.000 audience was held on 16 March 2002 at the Olympic Medals Plaza in downtown Salt Lake City.

Sports
The games consisted of four disciplines in three sports, with 92 medal events in total.

Venues 
In total 5 venues were used at the 2002 Winter Olympics around 4 cities and towns.

Salt Lake City
Rice-Eccles Olympic Stadium – opening ceremonies
2002 Olympic Medals Plaza – closing ceremonies

Weber County, Utah
Snowbasin: Alpine skiing

Wasatch County, Utah
Soldier Hollow: Biathlon and Cross-Country

West Valley City, Utah
E Center: Ice sledge hockey

Medal table

The top 10 NPCs by number of gold medals are listed below. The host nation (United States) is highlighted.

Participating National Paralympics Committees
36 nations qualified athletes for the games. Six countries:Andorra, Chile, China, Croatia, Greece and Hungary all made their debut appearances. Slovenia was the only nation who did not send a delegation after having participated in the previous games.

Symbol and mascot of the games

Paralympic Emblem
The logo of the Salt Lake 2002 Paralympic Winter Games is made up of three distinct marks. The sphere on the top represents the head of the Paralympic athlete and also symbolizes the global unity of the Paralympic Movement. Two broad fluid lines represent the athlete in motion. The three taegeuks beneath the athlete reproduce the green, red and blue marks on the Paralympic Flag.

Mascot

The mascot for the Paralympic Winter Games in Salt Lake City 2002 was Otto the otter. Indigenous peoples of the Americas consider otters to be fast swimmers, though in some stories a bit of a show-off. After being nearly wiped out by pollution and over-trapping the river otter has been reintroduced to Utah and can be seen along the banks of the Green River and near Flaming Gorge. The otter was chosen as the official mascot of the Salt Lake 2002 Paralympic Winter Games because he embodies vitality and agility, and represents the spirit of every Paralympian.

See also

 2002 Winter Olympics
 2007 Winter Deaflympics

References

External links
Official site
International Paralympic Committee
Paralympics at SVT's open archive (including the 2002 event) 

 
Paralympics
Paralympics
Sports competitions in Salt Lake City
Winter Paralympic Games
2002 in sports in Utah
Winter multi-sport events in the United States
2000s in Salt Lake City
March 2002 sports events in the United States